Gandaca harina, the tree yellow, is a butterfly in the family Pieridae. It is found in India, Thailand, Cambodia, Myanmar, Malaysia, Singapore, Philippines, and Indonesia. The species was first described by Thomas Horsfield in 1829.

Subspecies

 Gandaca harina assamica Moore, 1906 – (Assam, Sikkim, Bengal)
 Gandaca harina andamana Moore, 1906 – (Andaman)
 Gandaca harina nicobarica Evans, 1932 – (Nicobar)
 Gandaca harina harina – (Java)
 Gandaca harina burmana Moore, 1906 – (S.Burma, Thailand - S.Vietnam)
 Gandaca harina auriflua Fruhstorfer, 1899 – (Sula Is., Banggai)
 Gandaca harina distanti Fruhstorfer, 1910 – (Peninsular Malaya, Singapore, Langkawi, Sumatra)
 Gandaca harina austrosundana Fruhstorfer, 1910 – (Lombok)

References

 
 
 
 
 

Coliadinae
Butterflies of Singapore
Butterflies of Indochina
Taxa named by Thomas Horsfield
Butterflies described in 1829